Tatiana Aleksandra Westbrook (née Krievins, born February 14, 1982) is an American YouTuber and makeup artist.

Career

YouTube 
Westbrook, a former image consultant turned makeup artist, created her YouTube channel GlamLifeGuru, later renamed Tati, on November 7, 2010. When she started, she knew little about cameras and editing. "At first, when I sat down to edit, it would be a twelve-hour process," she recalled in 2015, "Beauty tutorials still take a long time, but I've been able to get this down to three hours."

According to Newsweek, she is "widely considered to be a progenitor of YouTube’s beauty scene" and "the mother of the YouTube beauty community." She reached the one-million subscriber milestone in early 2016. Westbrook primarily focuses on makeup and beauty reviews, tips, and tutorials.

Tati Beauty 
In October 2019, she launched a cosmetic line named Tati Beauty, with her first product being a textured neutrals eye shadow palette. In November 2021, Westbrook announced that Tati Beauty was closing in  an almost nine-minute video titled "Why I'm Closing Tati Beauty", citing the COVID-19 pandemic and legal troubles.

Halo Beauty 
In February 2018, Westbrook founded and launched her own company, Halo Beauty Inc., which sells vitamin supplements. Westbrook makes an estimated $1.3 million a year from YouTube and her company.

Controversies

James Charles controversy 
On April 22, 2019, Westbrook posted an Instagram story in which she discussed feeling betrayed by the beauty community. A few hours prior to her post, fellow beauty YouTuber James Charles posted an advertisement for SugarBearHair, a competitor to Westbrook's company Halo Beauty. On May 10, 2019, Westbrook posted a 43-minute YouTube video titled BYE SISTER... in which she claimed the feud between her and Charles was not only about advertising but also about her history with Charles and allegations that he preyed on heterosexual men. She gained more than four million subscribers in a week as a result of the video, and Charles lost more than three million subscribers in four days. She reached a peak following of over 10.6 million subscribers. Charles responded to the claims on May 18 with a video titled No More Lies in which he shared his side of the story. Westbrook subsequently lost over a million subscribers, as well as eligibility for YouTube's Diamond Creator Award.

On June 30, 2020, Westbrook posted a video on her YouTube channel titled Breaking My Silence..., detailing the events that led up to, and occurred after her BYE SISTER... video, in which she claimed Shane Dawson and Jeffree Star manipulated her into making the video against Charles. The video has been set to Private as of June 2021.

Halo Beauty lawsuit 
Since October 20, 2020, Westbrook and her husband, James, have been sued by former business partner and co-founder of Halo Beauty, Clark Swanson, for breach of contract, gross negligence and fraudulent inducement as it relates to Tati's vitamin line, Halo Beauty.

Personal life 
Tati is of Latvian ancestry. In 2017, she married James Westbrook, who regularly appears in her YouTube videos.  Through this marriage, she has a stepson named Taylor who also occasionally appears in her videos.

As of June 2021, Tati has returned to YouTube in a post titled "A Year Later…" where she announced that she will be returning to her roots doing makeup tutorials and reviews. This comes after nearly a year hiatus from YouTube with her last post being a now deleted apology to another YouTuber, James Charles (see controversy section). Additionally, the recent video reaffirms Tati is still actively involved with Halo Beauty as the CEO while litigation continues (see controversy section).

References

External links
 
 

1982 births
Living people
American make-up artists
American people of Latvian descent
American women in business
American YouTubers
Beauty and makeup YouTubers
Businesspeople from Seattle
American cosmetics businesspeople
21st-century American women